The Chinese Ambassador to Niger is the official representative of the People's Republic of China to Niger.

List of representatives

See also
China–Niger relations

References 

Ambassadors of China to Niger
Niger